The  was an infantry division of the Imperial Japanese Army. It was formed 10 August 1945 in Changchun as a triangular division.

Action
The 158th division was organised from the cadets of the training units during the Soviet invasion of Manchuria. The war ended with the surrender of Japan 15 August 1945 before the 158th division can complete the organization.

See also
 List of Japanese Infantry Divisions

Notes and references
This article incorporates material from Japanese Wikipedia page 第158師団 (日本軍), accessed 14 July 2016
 Madej, W. Victor, Japanese Armed Forces Order of Battle, 1937–1945 [2 vols], Allentown, PA: 1981.

Japanese World War II divisions
Infantry divisions of Japan
Military units and formations established in 1945
Military units and formations disestablished in 1945
1945 establishments in Japan
1945 disestablishments in Japan